"Red Lips" may refer to:
Red Lips (film) (1928), film based on The Plastic Age with James T. O'Donohoe
"Red Lips" (song), a Sky Ferreira song.
"Red Lips", song by Johnny Desmond  1970